James Blaney (born 21 February 1974) is an Irish former rugby union player and current coach.

Career
Blaney began his playing career with native province Leinster in 1994, before joining their rivals Munster ahead of the 2000–01 season and spending five seasons with the southern province, during which time they reached the Heineken Cup final in 2002, won the Celtic League in 2002–03 and the Celtic Cup in 2004–05. Blaney also represented Ireland A during his career, the team one level below the senior national team.

Having played for Terenure College in the amateur All-Ireland League, Blaney transitioned into coaching in 2006, first as a player-coach and then as an assistant coach with Terenure. He was appointed the club's new head coach in 2012, a position he held until leaving the club 2019 after he was appointed as the new head coach of Blackrock College ahead of the 2019–20 All-Ireland League season.

References

External links
Munster Profile

Living people
1974 births
Rugby union players from Dublin (city)
Irish rugby union players
Terenure College RFC players
Leinster Rugby players
Munster Rugby players
Rugby union hookers
Irish rugby union coaches